Rochy-Condé is a railway station located in the commune of Rochy-Condé in the Oise department, France. The station is located at kilometre point 80.259 on the Creil - Beauvais line and is served by TER Hauts-de-France trains. It was also the terminus of a line between Rochy-Condé and Soissons via Clermont-de-l'Oise and Compiègne, now closed and partly abandoned.

References

Railway stations in Oise